Bernard Henry (B.J.) Johnson (born April 20, 1987) is an American swimmer who specializes in breaststroke events.

Early and personal life
Johnson was born in Seattle, Washington, and is Jewish. His parents are Sandra and Bernard Johnson, and he has a sister, Roxanne. His nickname is Baba Juice.

He attended Garfield High School in Seattle, Washington, and graduated in 2005. He then attended Stanford University, graduating in 2009 with a major in Mechanical Engineering.

Swimming career
At Garfield High School, Johnson was an All-American swimmer during both his junior and senior years. At the 2005 Washington state championship, he finished second in the 100 fly and the 200 IM.

Swimming for the Stanford Cardinal, in both 2007 and 2008 Johnson was Pac-10 All-Academic first-team. In his junior season in 2007-08, his 2:04.07 time in the 200y breaststroke was the seventh-fastest time for Stanford ever, and his 57.25 time in the 100y breaststroke was the eighth-fastest.

Johnson qualified for the FINA 2013 World Aquatics Championships after he placed 2nd in the 2013 US National Championships in the 200m breaststroke with a time of 2:10.09.  He also placed 4th in the 100m breaststroke with 1:00.68. In 2013 his personal best of 2:10.09 at the U.S. nationals led to him being ranked # 2 in the US, and # 9 in the world.

In December 2014 Johnson won the 200y breaststroke at the King Marlin Elite Pro-Am in Oklahoma City with a time of 1:54.10.

As of February 2015 Johnson had recorded the all-time 9th-fastest U.S. time in the 200m breaststroke, and was on the U.S. National Swim Team. In July 2015 he represented Team USA at the 2015 Pan American Games, coming in 4th in the 200m breaststroke and 7th in the 100m breaststroke.

In April 2016, he won the 200m breaststroke in 2:14.16 at the Arena Pro Swim meet.

Johnson was on Team USA at the 2017 Maccabiah Games, having chosen not to compete in the World Trials so he could place his attention on the Maccabiah Games. He won gold medals in the men's 100m breaststroke, with a time of 1:01.27 (a new Maccabiah record), as well as in the 200m breaststroke, with a time of 2:11.60.

References

External links
 
 
 BJ Johnson – Stanford University athlete profile at GoStanford.com

1987 births
Living people
American male breaststroke swimmers
Jewish American sportspeople
Jewish swimmers
Maccabiah Games medalists in swimming
Maccabiah Games gold medalists for the United States
Competitors at the 2017 Maccabiah Games
Stanford Cardinal men's swimmers
Stanford University alumni
Swimmers from Seattle
Swimmers at the 2015 Pan American Games
Pan American Games competitors for the United States
21st-century American Jews